An art movement is a tendency or style in art with a specific common philosophy or goal, followed by a group of artists during a specific period of time, (usually a few months, years or decades) or, at least, with the heyday of the movement defined within a number of years. Art movements were especially important in modern art, when each consecutive movement was considered as a new avant-garde movement. Western art had been, from the Renaissance up to the middle of the 19th century, underpinned by the logic of perspective and an attempt to reproduce an illusion of visible reality (figurative art). By the end of the 19th century many artists felt a need to create a new style which would encompass the fundamental changes taking place in technology, science and philosophy (abstract art).

Concept 
According to theories associated with modernism and the concept of postmodernism, art movements are especially important during the period of time corresponding to modern art. The period of time called "modern art" is posited to have changed approximately halfway through the 20th century and art made afterward is generally called contemporary art. Postmodernism in visual art begins and functions as a parallel to late modernism and refers to that period after the "modern" period called contemporary art. The postmodern period began during late modernism (which is a contemporary continuation of modernism), and according to some theorists postmodernism ended in the 21st century. During the period of time corresponding to "modern art" each consecutive movement was often considered a new avant-garde.

Also during the period of time referred to as "modern art" each movement was seen corresponding to a somewhat grandiose rethinking of all that came before it, concerning the visual arts. Generally there was a commonality of visual style linking the works and artists included in an art movement. Verbal expression and explanation of movements has come from the artists themselves, sometimes in the form of an art manifesto, and sometimes from art critics and others who may explain their understanding of the meaning of the new art then being produced.

In the visual arts, many artists, theorists, art critics, art collectors, art dealers and others mindful of the unbroken continuation of modernism and the continuation of modern art even into the contemporary era, ascribe to and welcome new philosophies of art as they appear. Postmodernist theorists posit that the idea of art movements are no longer as applicable, or no longer as discernible, as the notion of art movements had been before the postmodern era. There are many theorists however who doubt as to whether or not such an era was actually a fact; or just a passing fad.

The term refers to tendencies in visual art, novel ideas and architecture, and sometimes literature. In music it is more common to speak about genres and styles instead. See also cultural movement, a term with a broader connotation.

As the names of many art movements use the -ism suffix (for example cubism and futurism), they are sometimes referred to as isms.

19th century

Academic, c. 16th century–20th century
Aesthetic Movement
American Barbizon school
American Impressionism
Amsterdam Impressionism
Art Nouveau, c. 1890–1910
Arts and Crafts Movement, founded 1860s
Barbizon school, c. 1830s–1870s
Biedermeier, c. 1815–1848
Cloisonnism, c. 1888–1900s (decade)
Danish Golden Age c. 1800s-1850s
Decadent movement
Divisionism, c. 1880s–1910s
Düsseldorf School
Etching revival
Expressionism, c. 1890s–1930s
German Romanticism, c. 1790s–1850s
Gründerzeit
Hague School, c. 1860s–1890s
Heidelberg School, c. 1880s–1900s (decade)
Hoosier Group
Hudson River School, c. 1820s–1900s (decade)
Hurufiyya movement mid-20th-century in North Africa and the Middle East
Impressionism, c. 1860s–1920s
Incoherents, c. 1882-1890s
Jugendstil
Les Nabis, c. 1890s–1900s (decade)
Les Vingt
Letras y figuras, c. 1845-1900s
Luminism
Lyon School
Macchiaioli c. 1850s–1900s (decade)
Mir iskusstva, founded 1898
Modernism, c. 1860s-ongoing
Naturalism
Nazarene, c. 1810s–1830
Neo-Classicism, c. 1780s–1900s (decade)
Neo-impressionism, c. 1880s–1910s
Norwegian romantic nationalism, c. 1840–1867
Norwich School, founded 1803
Orientalism
Peredvizhniki
Pointillism, c. 1880s–1910s
Pont-Aven School, c. 1850s–1890s
Post-Impressionism, c. 1880s–1900s (decade)
Pre-Raphaelite Brotherhood
Realism, c. 1850s–1900s (decade)
 Realism, c. 1850s–1900s (decade)
Romanticism, c. 1750s–1890s
Secession groups, c. 1890s–1910s
Society of American Artists, c. 1877–1906
Spanish Eclecticism, c. 1845-1890s
Symbolism
Synthetism, c. 1877–1900s (decade)
Tipos del País
Tonalism, c. 1880–1915
Vienna Secession, founded 1897
Volcano School
White Mountain art, c. 1820s–1870s
Spiritualist art, c. 1870–

20th century

1900–1921

Academic, c. 1900s (decade)-ongoing
American realism, c. 1890s–1920s
Analytic Cubism, c. 1909–1912
Art Deco, c. 1910–1939
Ashcan School, c. 1890s–1920s
Australian tonalism, c. 1910s–1930s
Berliner Sezession, founded 1898
Bloomsbury Group, c. 1900s (decade)–1960s
Brandywine School
Camden Town Group, c. 1911–1913
Constructivism, c. 1920–1922, 1920s–1940s
Cubism, c. 1906–1919
Cubo-Futurism, c. 1912–1918
Czech Cubism, c. 1910–1914
Dada, c. 1916–1922
Der Blaue Reiter, c. 1911–1914
De Stijl, c. 1917–1931
Deutscher Werkbund, founded 1907
Die Brücke, founded 1905
Expressionism c. 1890s–1930s
Fauvism, c. 1900–1910
Futurism, c. 1909–1916
German Expressionism, c. 1913–1930
Group of Seven (Canada), c. 1913–1930s
Jack of Diamonds, founded 1909
Luminism (Impressionism), c. 1900s (decade)–1930s
Modernism, c. 1860s–ongoing
Neo-Classicism, c. 1900s (decade)–ongoing
Neo-primitivism, from 1913
Neue Künstlervereinigung München
Novembergruppe, founded 1918
Objective abstraction, c. 1933–1936
Orphism, c. 1910–1913
Photo-Secession, founded c. 1902
Pittura Metafisica, c. 1911–1920
Proto-Cubism, c. 1906–1908
Purism, c. 1917–1930s
Rayonism
Section d'Or, c. 1912–1914
Suprematism, formed c. 1915–1916
Synchromism, founded 1912
Synthetic Cubism, c. 1912–1919
The Eight, c. 1909–1918
The Ten, c. 1897–1920
Vorticism, founded 1914

1920–1945

American Scene painting, c. 1920s–1950s
Arbeitsrat für Kunst
Art Deco
Bauhaus, c. 1919–1933
Concrete art
Der Ring
De Stijl, c. 1917–1931
Ecole de Paris
Geometric abstraction
Gruppo 7
International Style, c. 1920s–1970s
Kapists, c. 1930s
Magic Realism
Neo-Romanticism
Neue Sachlichkeit
Novecento Italiano
Novembergruppe, founded 1918
Os renovadores, founded 1922
Precisionism, c. 1918–1940s
Regionalism (art), c. 1930s–1940s
Return to order, 1918–1922
Scuola Romana, c. 1928–1945
Social Realism, c. 1920s–1960s
Socialist Realism
Surrealism, c. 1920s–1960s
Universal Constructivism, c. 1930–1970

1940–1965

Abstract expressionism
Action painting
Arte Povera
Art Informel
Assemblage
Beatnik art
Chicago Imagists
CoBrA, c. 1948–1951
Color Field painting
Combine painting
De-collage
Fluxus
Happening
Hard-Edge Painting
Kinetic Art
Kitchen Sink School
Lettrism
Lyrical abstraction
Neo-Dada
New Brutalism
Northwest School
Nouveau Réalisme
Op Art
Organic abstraction
Outsider Art
Panic Movement
Pop Art
Post-painterly abstraction
Process art
Public art
Retro art
Serial art
Shaped canvas
Situationist International
Tachism
Video art

1965–2000

Abstract Illusionism
Appropriation
Arte Povera
Art Photography
Body Art
Classical Realism
Conceptual Art
Dogme 95
Earth Art
Figuration Libre
Funk art
Graffiti art
Hyperrealism
Installation art
Internet Art
Land art
Late modernism
Light and Space
Lowbrow
Lyrical Abstraction
Mail art
Massurrealism
Maximalism
Minimalism
Neo-Expressionism
Neo-figurative
Neo-pop
Performance Art
Postminimalism
Postmodernism
Photorealism
Psychedelic art
Relational art
Site-specific art
Sound Art
Transavanguardia
Young British Artists

21st century

Algorithmic art
Altermodernism
Biomorphism
Computer art
Computer graphics
Craftivism
Digital art
Electronic Art
Empathism
Environmental art
Excessivism
Intentism
Internet art
Intervention art
Metamodernism
Modern European ink painting
Neo-minimalism
New Media Art
Pixel art
Post-postmodernism
Relational art
Remodernism
Social practice (art)
SoFlo Superflat
Stuckism International
Superflat
Superstroke
Transgressive art
Toyism
Unilalianism
Vaporwave
Postinternet
Artificial intelligence art

See also 

20th-century Western painting
Art periods
List of art movements
Post-expressionism
Western art history

References

External links 
 Art Movements since 1900 at the-artists.org
 20th-Century Art Compiled by Dr.Witcombe, Sweet Briar College, Virginia.
 WebMuseum, Paris Themes index and detailed glossary of art periods.

 
Art history
Style
Visual arts